The Blue Print: Us vs. Them is the debut studio album by British hip hop duo D-Block Europe, self-released on October 9, 2020. It features guest appearances from Aitch, Lil Pino, Raye, Srno and Stefflon Don. The album debuted at number 2 on the UK Albums Chart and number 1 on the UK R&B Albums Chart. It was supported with five singles: "Free 22", "Plain Jane", "We Won", "UFO" and "Destiny", which all peaked in the UK Official Singles Chart's top 40. The album was BPI certified  Silver on March 5, 2021 for accumulating over 60,000 album-equivalent units in the United Kingdom.

Track listing

Personnel 
 Young Adz – performer (tracks: 1-9, 11-21, 23-29)
 Dirtbike LB – performer (tracks: 1-10, 12-16, 18-24, 26-29)
 Stefflon Don – performer (track 6)
 Aitch – performer (track 19)
 Raye – performer (track 21)
 Lil Pino – performer (track 22)
 Srno – performer (track 24)
 Carson Avery Lee – producer (track 22)
 Jony-Christan Linton-Jude – producer (tracks: 1, 23, 25, 27)
 Sean D Engineer – recording, mixing, mastering
 Meero – producer (tracks: 3-4)
 Mindthegap – producers (track 11)
 BKH Beats - Producer (Tracks 2-9)

Charts

Weekly charts

Year-end charts

Certifications

See also 
 List of UK R&B Albums Chart number ones of 2020

References 

2020 debut albums
D-Block Europe albums
Self-released albums